Balansun is a commune of the Pyrénées-Atlantiques department in the Nouvelle-Aquitaine region of south-western France.

The inhabitants of the commune are known as Balansenais or Balansenaises.

Geography
Balansun is a commune in the former province of Béarn located some 6 km east of Orthez and 4 km north of Argagnon. Access to the commune is by the D946 road from Arthez-de-Béarn in the east which passes through the centre of the commune south of the village and continues south-west to join the D817 west of Castétis. Access to the village is by the Chemin de l'Eglise which branches north off the D946 on the western side of the commune. The commune is mixed forest and farmland.

The commune is located in the Drainage basin of the Adour with the Ruisseau de Clamondé forming the southern border of the commune as it flows west to join the Gave de Pau west of Castetis. Three streams flow through the commune from east to west into the Ruisseau de Clamondé gathering many tributaries in the commune/

Places and hamlets

 Barran
 Bélou
 Bergerayre
 Bernadou
 Bidau
 Bordes
 Bourroua
 Bousque
 Cabalé
 Cabanne
 Cantegrith
 Cantonnier
 Carsuzaa
 Chou
 Cousiner
 Craber
 Crabérou
 Friquet
 Garly
 Heugarès
 Lacabanne
 Laheuguère
 Larribau
 Lasserre
 Lay
 Loup
 Loustalet
 Massioo
 Menaut
 Menusé
 Millet
 Moncaud
 Monhort
 Naudou
 Rouby
 Saint-Martin
 Sarraillot
 Sautié
 Tisnérot
 Touyarot
 Trotemenut

Neighbouring communes and villages

Toponymy
Michel Grosclaude said that the origin of the original name is the Gascon Latin name of a man Valentius with the suffix -unum.

The following table details the origins of the commune name and other names in the commune.

Sources:
Grosclaude: Toponymic Dictionary of communes, Béarn, 2006 
Raymond: Topographic Dictionary of the Department of Basses-Pyrenees, 1863, on the page numbers indicated in the table. 
Cassini: Cassini Map from 1750
Ldh/EHESS/Cassini: 

Origins:
Bérérenx: Chapter of Bérérenx
Fors de Béarn
Pardies: Notaries of Pardies
Census: Census of Béarn
Froissart: Jean Froissart, Book IV
Reformation: Reformation of Béarn

History
Paul Raymond noted that on page 20 of his 1863 dictionary that the fief of Balansun was a vassal of the Viscounts of Béarn and, in 1385, had 27 fires depending on the bailiwick of Pau.

Administration
List of Successive Mayors

Mayors from 1942

Inter-communality
The commune is part of four inter-communal structures:
 the Communauté de communes de Lacq-Orthez;
 the SIVU of Balansun/Castétis;
 the water and sanitation association of Trois Cantons;
 the Energy association of Pyrénées-Atlantiques;

Demography
In 2017 the commune had 287 inhabitants.

Economy
Economic activity is mainly agricultural (livestock).

Sites and monuments
The Parish Church of the Assumption of Notre-Dame (1850) is registered as an historical monument.

Facilities
The commune has a primary school which is grouped in an RPI (Intercommunal Educational Grouping) with the primary school in Castétis.

See also
Communes of the Pyrénées-Atlantiques department

References

External links

Balensun on the 1750 Cassini Map

Communes of Pyrénées-Atlantiques